The Chinese Taipei women's national under-18 and under-19 basketball team is a national basketball team of Republic of China on Taiwan and is governed by the Chinese Taipei Basketball Association (Traditional Chinese: 中華台北籃球協會). 
It represents the country in international under-19 and under-18 (under age 19 and under age 18) women's basketball competitions.

See also
Chinese Taipei women's national basketball team
Chinese Taipei women's national under-17 basketball team
Chinese Taipei men's national under-19 basketball team

References

under
Women's national under-19 basketball teams